Orai is a constituency of the Uttar Pradesh Legislative Assembly covering the city of Orai in the Jalaun district of Uttar Pradesh, India.

Orai is one of five assembly constituencies in the Jalaun Lok Sabha constituency. Since 2008, this assembly constituency is numbered 221 amongst 403 constituencies.

Election results

2022 
Bharatiya Janta Party candidate Gauri Shankar won in 2017 Uttar Pradesh Legislative Elections defeating Samajwadi Party candidate.

2017
Bharatiya Janta Party candidate Gauri Shankar won in 2017 Uttar Pradesh Legislative Elections defeating Samajwadi Party candidate Mahendra Singh by a margin of 78,879 votes.

References

External links
 

Assembly constituencies of Uttar Pradesh
Orai